The Otterdale Formation is a geologic formation in Virginia. It preserves fossils dating back to the Triassic period.  

It was first identified at exposures near Otterdale, Chesterfield County, Virginia, within the Richmond Basin.  Shaler and Woodworth described it as follows:
Coarse sandstones, often feldspathic, with silicified trunks of Araucarioxylon; well developed north, south, and west of Otterdale. Thickness, 500+ feet.

See also

 List of fossiliferous stratigraphic units in Virginia
 Paleontology in Virginia

References

 

Triassic geology of Virginia